Zacharie Cloutier (c. 1590 – September 17, 1677) was a French carpenter who immigrated to New France in 1634 in the first wave of the Percheron immigration from the former province of Perche, to an area that is today part of Quebec, Canada. He settled in Beauport and founded one of the foremost families of Quebec.

Early life 
Many sources state that Zacharie Cloutier was born about 1590 in the parish of Saint-Jean, Mortagne-au-Perche, France. Cloutier was one of several children of Denis Cloutier and his first wife Renée Brière.

The notary Mathurin Roussel of Mortagne called Cloutier the "family peacemaker," describing how Cloutier helped his father and brother solve a dispute involving inheritance. In the parish of his birth, Cloutier wedded Xainte (aka Sainte) Dupont, on July 18, 1616. Xainte had been born around 1595 in Mortagne to Paul-Michel and Perrine Dupont, and was the widow of Michel Lermusier. He and his family were among a group of settlers who travelled from Perche, an area next to the old province of Normandy in France.

In 1619 Henri II de Montmorency purchased the New France colony from his brother-in-law Henry II of Bourbon. Included amongst the laborers hired to assist Samuel de Champlain in "inhabiting, clearing, cultivating and planting" New France were the names of Zacharie and his father Denis. This group was not a group of settlers, but a group of laborers, who would return to France once their work had been completed. Several years later, however, Cloutier returned to Canada to help establish a new settlement at Beauport.

Life in New France 

Cloutier was one of the first Frenchmen recruited by Robert Giffard de Moncel to expand the colony of New France by settling the Beauport area near Quebec City. Cloutier arrived in 1634 (at the age of about 44) and either arrived with or was soon followed by his family. This was an important addition to the colony's population which numbered about 100 prior to his arrival. Cloutier worked with fellow immigrant Jean Guyon du Buisson to construct Giffard's manor house (the oldest house in Canada) and other colonial buildings.

Cloutier and Guyon resisted for several years paying the fealty and homage owed to Giffard under the Seigneurial system of New France until the Governor of New France explicitly ordered them to do so. This was one of the first disputes against transplanting Old World hierarchy to the New World that would carry through the centuries even past the time of the British conquest.

In 1652 Cloutier received a grant of land from Governor Jean de Lauzon in Château-Richer, Quebec. The land on which Cloutier lived in Beauport was known as La Clouterie (or La Cloutièrerie). In 1670 Nicolas Dupont de Neuville purchased this land from Cloutier. This action resulted in disagreements between Cloutier, his neighbor, Jean Guyon, and Giffard, his seigneur, resulting in the Cloutier family's relocation to Château-Richer.

Zacharie Cloutier died on September 17, 1677 at the age of about 87. His wife died three years later on July 13, 1680, and was buried with her husband in Château-Richer.

Children
Together Zacharie and Xainte had six children, one of whom died in childhood. The marriage of his daughter Anne to Robert Drouin is the oldest recorded marriage in Canada. In 1636, when her marriage contract was drawn, Anne was merely ten years of age. The religious sacrament of marriage was not performed until a year later on July 12, 1637. However, according to the contract drawn the year prior, the couple would only be allowed non-conjugal visits for the next two years.

Notable descendants
Zacharie Cloutier is the common ancestor of the Cloutiers of North America, some with spelling variations. By 1800, Cloutier had 10,850 French-Canadian descendants, the most of any Quebec colonist, according to marriage records studied by the Historical Demography Research Program of the Université de Montréal.

Cloutier is a common ancestor of the following people:

David Archambault
Lee Archambault
Mark Belanger
Jehane Benoît
Justin Bieber
Marcheline Bertrand
Joseph-Armand Bombardier
Isabelle Boulay
Camilla, Queen Consort of the United Kingdom
Jim Carrey
Madonna Ciccone
Hillary Rodham Clinton
Albert Edward Cloutier
Alexandre Cloutier
Dan Cloutier
François Cloutier
Gary Cloutier
Gilles Cloutier
Guy Cloutier
Guylaine Cloutier
Jacques Cloutier
Réal Cloutier
Suzanne Cloutier
T. J. Cloutier
Véronique Cloutier
Manuel Clouthier
Tatiana Clouthier
Manuel Clouthier Carrillo
Tirso Cruz III
Laura de Jonge
Céline Dion
The Dionne quintuplets
Nathan Fillion
Marc-Aurèle Fortin
Éric Serge Gagné
Ricky Gervais
Ryan Gosling
George R. D. Goulet
Tag Goulet
Nicolette Goulet
Robert Goulet
James Haven
Camille Henry
Derek Hough
Julianne Hough
Amy Jo Johnson
Angelina Jolie
George Keppel
Jack Kerouac
Beyoncé Knowles
Solange Knowles
Lyndon LaRouche
Brie Larson
Avril Lavigne
Lynda Lemay
Jojo Levesque
Marie-Louise Meilleur
Alanis Morissette
Wade Morissette
Julie Payette
Paul Picard
Chris Pratt
Michael Sarrazin
Louis St Laurent
Diane Tell
Délia Tétreault
Meghan Trainor
Alex Trebek
Justin Trudeau
Pierre Trudeau
Shania Twain
Gabriel Richard

Ancestry
Little is known about the Cloutier ancestors in France, beyond the names of the mother and father of Zacharie Cloutier, Denis Cloutier and Marie-Renée Brière.

The most common variation of the surname is Cloustier. Most sources state the surname was originally given to a person who crafted and sold nails, coming from the Latin word clavus 'nail' (clou in French). Some descendants of Cloutier who immigrated to the United States from Canada changed their surnames to Nailer in this respect.

A common error found in Internet family trees in 2004 was that Nicolas Cloutier was listed as Zacharie's grandfather, due to a misreading of "N.. Cloutier" as referring to a person whose first name started with the letter N, when in context the "N.." signified that the first name was unknown.

Honours
In 1972, a house originally built and lived in by Cloutier was reconstructed and named a provincial heritage site.

In 1984, a monument was erected in Beauport (which has since been merged into Quebec City as of 2002) to commemorate the 350th anniversary of Cloutier's arrival.

An award-winning artisanal cheese bears his name, the Zacharie Cloutier (cheese) (fr).

See also 

Canadians
Provinces and territories of Canada

References

Further reading

 

1590s births
1677 deaths
People from Mortagne-au-Perche
French emigrants to pre-Confederation Quebec
People of New France
French carpenters
Immigrants to New France